Annapolis Salute is a 1937 film. A few scenes were shot at William Paca House.

Cast
 James Ellison as Bill J. Martin
 Marsha Hunt as Julia Clemens
 Harry Carey as Chief Martin
 Van Heflin as Clay V. Parker
 Ann Hovey as Bunny Oliver
 Arthur Lake as Cuthbert A. "Tex" Clemens
 Dick Hogan as Bob D. Wilson
 Marilyn Vernon as Mary Lou
 John Griggs as Dwight Moore

(cast list as per AFI database)

References

External links
 

1937 drama films
1937 films
American drama films
American black-and-white films
Films shot in Maryland
1930s English-language films
1930s American films